The India women's national cricket team toured Australia in October and November 2008. They played Australia in 1 Twenty20 International and 5 One Day Internationals. Every international match on the tour was won by Australia.

Squads

Tour Matches

50-over match: Australia Under-21s v India

50-over match: New South Wales v India

50-over match: Australia Under-21s v India

Only WT20I

WODI Series

1st ODI

2nd ODI

3rd ODI

4th ODI

5th ODI

References

External links
India Women tour of Australia 2008/09 from Cricinfo

International cricket competitions in 2008
2008 in women's cricket
Women's international cricket tours of Australia
India women's national cricket team tours